Herbert Christian Bankole-Bright (23 August 1883 – 14 December 1958) was a well-known political activist in Sierra Leone.

Early life
Herbert Bankole-Bright was born in Okrika, in an area the British would the next year designate the Oil Rivers Protectorate, on 23 August 1883, the son of Jacob Galba Bright and his wife Letitia (née Williams), Creole descendants of Sierra Leone Liberated Africans. Bright's paternal grandfather, John Bright, was an ex-slave who had been liberated off a slave ship with his mother in 1823.

Bright was educated at the Wesleyan Boys' High School in Freetown (1898–1904), and then studied medicine at Edinburgh University (1905–10), before setting up a practice in Freetown. At Edinburgh, he became "politically awake" and was involved in a number of student activist debates and policies. In November 1911 he married Addah Maude, daughter of former legislative council member T. Colenso Bishop, and they eventually had four children.

Political activist career
In 1918, Bright set up the Aurora newspaper, which he edited until 1925.  In 1920, he was a founder member of the National Congress of British West Africa, and was elected to the Legislative Council in 1924. In 1925 he inspired Ladipo Solanke's formation of the West African Students' Union, becoming a founder member. With Ernest Beoku-Betts, he campaigned for increased suffrage and against racism, without success.

In 1939, following a feud with Isaac Wallace-Johnson, Bright supported government measures to limit the activities of Johnson's Youth Leagues.  This alienated many of Bright's supporters, and he temporarily stepped down from politics.

In the 1940s, Bright founded the National Council of Sierra Leone, and it became the main opposition at the 1951 Sierra Leonean general election.  After spending the next six years attempting to obstruct all government activities, the National Council lost all its seats at the 1957 election.

Legacy
Professor Akintola J. G. Wyse wrote a biography of H. C. Bankole-Bright that was dedicated to the author's family and his late sister, Lerina Taylor-Bright.

References

Hakim Adi, West Africans in Britain: 1900-1960

1883 births
1958 deaths
Sierra Leone Creole people
Saro people
Sierra Leonean pan-Africanists
Members of the Legislative Council of Sierra Leone
Sierra Leonean people of Liberated African descent
National Council of Sierra Leone politicians
People educated in Freetown, Sierra Leone
People from Okrika
Alumni of the University of Edinburgh
20th-century Sierra Leonean people
Emigrants from the Niger Coast Protectorate to Sierra Leone